The All-Star Teams for the now defunct British Ice Hockey Superleague were voted for by members of The British Ice Hockey Writers Association (now known as Ice Hockey Journalists UK) to honour the best players at the end of each season.

1996-1997 

NB: Only one All-Star team was elected in the 1996/97 season.

1997-1998 

First Team

Second Team

1998-1999 

First Team

Second Team

1999-2000 

First Team

Second Team

2000-2001 

First Team

Second Team

2001-2002 

First Team

Second Team

2002-2003 

First Team

Second Team

See also 
EIHL All-Star Team

External links 
Ice Hockey Journalists UK

All